The 1952 Inter-Camp P.O.W. Olympics, also known as Inter-Camp POW Olympic Games, was a mock Olympic Games held at the Pyuktong Prisoner-of-War Camp (碧潼战俘营) of the Chinese People's Volunteer Army during the Korean War. The athletes were all United Nations POWs. It was often used as a propaganda campaign by China and North Korea to encourage more UN soldiers to surrender.

1952 Inter-Camp P.O.W. Olympics was not authorized by the International Olympic Committee, but was organized by the Chinese People's Volunteer Army, in accordance with the Olympic Charter.

The games
The POW Olympics were held between 15–27 November 1952 at Pyuktong, D.P.R.K. The Chinese hoped to gain worldwide publicity and, whilst some prisoners refused to participate, over 500 prisoners of 11 nationalities took part. They were representative of all the prison camps in North Korea  and competed in American football, baseball, softball, basketball, volleyball, track and field, soccer, gymnastics, and boxing. For the prisoners, this was an opportunity to meet with friends from other camps. They also acted as photographers, announcers and even reporters, who after each day's competition published a newsletter, the Olympic Roundup.

Propaganda value
The Olympics featured frequently in North Korean psychological warfare (PSYWAR) pamphlets and leaflets distributed to UN soldiers. The 1952 Olympics allowed Communist forces to point to the good conditions available to those who surrendered.

See also
1944 Summer Olympics during the Second World War at which prisoners of war from Oflag II-C staged a comparable unofficial Olympic games.

References

Bibliography

External links
 Scotland at War, including some artifacts and information from Scottish POWs at the 1952 Olympics
 Pictures and scans of the 1952 Olympic programme
 CBC: They chose China (English documentary, with Chinese subtitle) See also via Bilibili
 See also via Bilibili

Korean War
Korean War prisoners of war
POW Olympics
November 1952 events in Asia
Sports competitions in North Korea